Jarryd Wallace (born May 15, 1990) is an American T44 Paralympic sprint runner who won the 100 m event at the 2011 and 2015 Parapan American Games. He is a student in sport management at the University of Georgia.

Wallace was born to Jeff and Sabina Wallace and has an elder sister Brittany. He began running as an able-bodied athlete, but lost his right leg after developing compartment syndrome. He won gold medals in the 100 m at the 2011 and 2015 Parapan American Games and qualified for the 2012 and 2016 Paralympics. His 4 × 100 m T42-46 relay teams were disqualified on both occasions, while individually he placed sixth over 400 m in 2012 and fifth over 100 m in 2016.

References

1990 births
Living people
Paralympic track and field athletes of the United States
Track and field athletes from Georgia (U.S. state)
Athletes (track and field) at the 2012 Summer Paralympics
Athletes (track and field) at the 2016 Summer Paralympics
American male sprinters
Medalists at the 2011 Parapan American Games
Medalists at the 2015 Parapan American Games
Medalists at the World Para Athletics Championships
Sportspeople from Athens, Georgia
Athletes (track and field) at the 2020 Summer Paralympics
Medalists at the 2020 Summer Paralympics
Paralympic bronze medalists for the United States
Paralympic medalists in athletics (track and field)